This is a list of years in Swedish television.

Twenty-first century

Twentieth century

See also 
 List of years in Sweden
 Lists of Swedish films
 List of years in television

Television
Television in Sweden by year
Swedish television